Swamp Seed is the fifth album by the saxophonist Jimmy Heath of performances recorded in 1963, originally released on the Riverside label.

Reception

Scott Yanow of AllMusic wrote, "This is a delightful if underrated set... The music is straight-ahead but contains some unpredictable moments."

Track listing
All compositions by Jimmy Heath except as indicated
 "Six Steps" - 4:49     
 "Nutty" (Thelonious Monk) - 4:05     
 "More Than You Know" (Edward Eliscu, Billy Rose) Vincent Youmans) - 5:09     
 "Swamp Seed" (Percy Heath) - 5:19     
 "D Waltz" - 6:33     
 "Just in Time" (Betty Comden, Adolph Green, Jule Styne) - 5:28     
 "Wall to Wall" - 5:27

Personnel
Jimmy Heath - tenor saxophone
Donald Byrd - trumpet
Jim Buffington, Julius Watkins - French horn 
Don Butterfield - tuba
Herbie Hancock (tracks 3 & 5-7), Harold Mabern (tracks 1, 2 & 4) - piano
Percy Heath - double bass
Connie Kay (tracks 3 & 5-7), Albert Heath (tracks 1, 2 & 4) - drums

References

Riverside Records albums
Jimmy Heath albums
1963 albums